Team Fakta was a Danish professional road bicycle racing team, which was active in the seasons 1999 to 2003.  The main sponsor FDB is a consumer owned grocery chain, whose discount outlets are called Fakta.

Nicki Sørensen was on the team from 2000, Kurt Asle Arvesen and Scott Sunderland from 2001 and Magnus Bäckstedt from 2002.

Final roster

Major wins 

1999
Stage 1a Tour de Langkawi, Lennie Kristensen
2000
Stage 4 Tour de Normandie, Lennie Kristensen
Overall Circuit des Mines, Nicki Sørensen
Stage 1, Nicki Sørensen
Rund um die Hainleite-Erfurt, Nicki Sørensen
Lemvig-Holstebro-Lemvig, Nicki Sørensen
Stage 2 Sachsen-Tour, Morten Sonne
Fyn Rundt, Morten Sonne
2001
Stage 3 Tour of Rhodes, Marcus Ljungqvist
Stage 5 Tour de Normandie, Marcus Ljungqvist
Grand Prix Pino Cerami, Scott Sunderland
Rund um Düren, Bjørnar Vestøl
Overall Tour de Luxembourg, Jorgen Bo Petersen
 Time Trial Championships, Kurt Asle Arvesen
 Road Race Championships, Marcus Ljungqvist
Overall Sachsen-Tour, Jorgen Bo Petersen
Stage 2, Morten Sonne
Stage 4a, Jorgen Bo Petersen
Stage 5 Hessen-Rundfahrt, Bjørnar Vestøl
Stage 1 Ster Elektrotoer, Allan Bo Andresen
Grand Prix de Fourmies, Scott Sunderland
Stage 3 Rheinland-Pfalz Rundfahrt, Marcus Ljungqvist
Stage 3 Paris–Corrèze, Jorgen Bo Petersen
Stage 4 Herald Sun Tour, Scott Sunderland
Stage 7a Herald Sun Tour, Kurt Asle Arvesen
2002
GP Fayt-le-Franc, Magnus Bäckstedt
Paris–Camembert, Marcus Ljungqvist
Route Adélie de Vitré, Marcus Ljungqvist
Stage 4 Circuit des Mines, Jorgen Bo Petersen
Overall Tour de Luxembourg, Marcus Ljungqvist
Stage 2, Marcus Ljungqvist
Schynberg-Rundfahrt, Kurt Asle Arvesen
Stage 7 Tour of Austria, Scott Sunderland
Overall Tour of Sweden, Kurt Asle Arvesen
 Road Race Championships, Kurt Asle Arvesen
Fyen Rundt, Jacob Moe Rasmussen
Stage 3 Danmark Rundt, Kurt Asle Arvesen
GP Schwarzwald, Jorgen Bo Petersen
Stage 5 Rheinland-Pfalz Rundfahrt, Allan Johansen
Paris–Bourges, Allan Johansen
2003
GP de Villers-Cotterêts, Julian Winn
GP S.A.T.S.-Midtbank, Frank Hoj
Stage 10 Giro d'Italia, Kurt Asle Arvesen
 Time Trial Championships, Magnus Bäckstedt
Fyen Rundt, Jacob Moe Rasmussen

External links 
 Elmic's fan page  Source for this article.

Fakta
Fakta
Cycling teams established in 1999
Cycling teams disestablished in 2003
1999 establishments in Denmark